Gleichamberg is a former municipality in the district of  Hildburghausen in Thuringia. Since 31 December 2012, it is part of the town Römhild. Gleichamberg consisted of the following subdivisions:
 Buchenhof
 Bedheim
 Gleicherwiesen
 Eicha
 Simmershausen
 Zeilfeld
 Roth

Coat of arms
Officially granted on 5 January 1993, the lower part of the shield shows the two dominating hills in the area, the greater and lesser Gleichberg. The scissors are taken from the arms of the family of Milz and their relatives the noble family of Scherenberg (the word Schere means "scissors" or "shears"). In the 15th century the family played a major role in the local history. The upper field is a type of prehistoric pin found in the Kleine Gleichberg. The colours are those of the arms of Rudolf von Scherenberg, as well as of the State of Würzburg, to which the area was once attached.

References

Former municipalities in Thuringia